The Mesquito is an American sounding rocket vehicle developed for the NASA Sounding Rocket Program on Wallops Island, Virginia. The Mesquito was developed to provide rocket-borne measurements of the mesospheric region of the upper atmosphere. An area of great science interest is in the 82–95 km region, where the conventional understanding of atmospherics physics is being challenged.

The Mesquito is a two-stage sounding rocket using a  solid propellant rocket motor as the first-stage propulsion device. The non-propulsive second-stage dart contains a free-flying structural body that includes an avionics suite and an experiment space with interface.

The maiden flight occurred on 6 May, 2008, from LC-2 at the Wallops Flight Facility.

Launch history

References 

Sounding rockets of the United States